Rod Laver was the defending champion, but lost in the quarterfinals this year against Tom Gorman.

Stan Smith won the men's singles title at the 1971 Queen's Club Championships tennis tournament, defeating John Newcombe 8–6, 6–3 in the final.

Draw

Finals

Top half

Section 1

Section 2

Bottom half

Section 3

Section 4

External links
 Main draw

1971 Queen's Club Championships